Gerd Spittler (born 4 April 1939 in Donaueschingen) is a German ethnologist. 

Spittler became known through his participation in developing the Africa focus at the University of Bayreuth and through his research on the Tuareg nomads. While in his early years as a sociologist he still concentrated on the area of "power and domination", as part of his professorship in Bayreuth, as an ethnologist he finally focused on other main topics: the ethnology of work, the ethnology of material needs, local action in a global context and research methodology. He has written and published several essays and books on these topics.

Biography 
Gerd Spittler grew up in Donaueschingen and graduated from the Fürstenberg-Gymnasium in 1958. From 1959 to 1966 he studied sociology, ethnology, economics and history at the Heidelberg University, and in Hamburg, Bordeaux, Basel and Freiburg. In 1966 he received his doctorate from the University of Freiburg . His dissertation "Norm and Sanction" from 1967 included two empirical research projects on the subject of sanction mechanisms. While the first investigation was carried out in a restaurant kitchen, where he worked part-time, the second investigation is based on his experiences in a psychosomatic clinic, where he took notes in an analysis group and took part in most clinic events. 

From 1968 to 1975 he worked as a research assistant of the Institute for Sociology at the University of Freiburg. In 1975 and 1976 he stepped in as stand-in professor for sociology at the Heidelberg University. In 1977 he finally returned to the University of Freiburg as a university lecturer. Here he taught from 1980 to 1988 as a professor of sociology. In 1976 he traveled to Niger for research purposes for the first time to examine the Kel Owey of Timia. His books ‘Droughts, War and Famines among the Kel Ewey 1980-1985’ and ‘Acting in a Famine Crisis’ are derived from research in this region. In the course of a one-month guest professorship in 1984, he gave lectures for the first time at the University of Niamey in Niger. 

From 1988 until his retirement in 2004 he held the first chair in ethnology at the University of Bayreuth. From 1990 to 1999, during his time in Bayreuth, Spittler was spokesman for the graduate college “Intercultural Relations in Africa”. From 1994 to 1999 he was managing director of the "Institute for African Studies", which coordinates Africa-related research and teaching at the University of Bayreuth and promotes cooperation with African universities and research institutions as well as with national and international Africa institutes. In 1996/1997 he took over the position of dean of the cultural studies faculty, where he also worked from 2000 to 2004 as spokesman for the cultural studies research college “Local action in Africa in the context of global influences”. Since 2002 he also chaired the Scientific Advisory Board of ‘Point Sud. Center de Recherche sur le Savoir Local’ in Bamako, Mali. The project supports individual field research, promotes cooperation between scientists from different backgrounds through joint seminars and research colloquia, and awards scholarships to young African scientists.

In the years after his retirement, Spittler taught at the universities of Basel, Bayreuth and Niamey (Niger), among others. From 2004 to 2007 he was also a member of the scientific advisory board of the Leibniz-Zentrum Moderner Orient in Berlin. From October 2006 to February 2007 he did research as a guest scientist at the WZB Berlin Social Science Center. In 2007 he was made an honorary member of the  German Society for Social and Cultural Anthropology (DGV).

Research focus  
Spittler began his research with legal sociological and legal ethnology issues before he concentrated on  peasant societies. Here, the focus of interest was mainly on the relationship between farmers and the state. This was followed by research with a focus on West African nomads, including the topics of drought and hunger crises, pastoral work, caravans, material culture, needs and consumption. This field of study included six years of field research among Tuareg and  Hausa in Niger, Nigeria and Algeria.

As a professor of ethnology in Bayreuth, he concentrated on four areas: the phiolosopy and history of work, material needs, local action in a global context, and methods of ethnology. In addition to general reflections on the anthropology of work, a topic that has been largely neglected in ethnology to date, Spittler primarily examined herdsmen's and farmer's work in his own research. As part of the Collaborative Research Center "Identity in Africa" and the graduate college "Intercultural Relations in Africa", he dealt with the working conditions of farmers, nomads, slaves and craftsmen, among other things.

Spittler's second focus dealt with material needs, consumption and material culture. This happened mainly in the project of the Collaborative Research Centres SFB/FK 560 "Local action in Africa in the context of global influences", which existed since 2000. Its focus was on the comparison of traditional food and goods and modern, imported consumer goods. Three West African villages (Hausa, Kasena, Tuare and the respective household inventories were examined and compared with German households. During the preparation and realization of this project, questions of globalization, local action, local vitality and appropriation were dealt with.

Publications (selection)  
Already during his time as a sociologist, Spittler published works that incorporated an ethnological interest. Thus, his early books “Reign over Peasants - The Spread of State Rule and an Islamic-Urban Culture in Gobir (Niger)” (published 1978) and “Administration in an African Peasant State” (1981) dealt with rather ethnological topics and gave an idea of the path that Spittler would take later-on. Overall, Spittler wrote eight monographs, edited five readers and published over 80 essays. Even after his retirement, Spittler continued to work as a journalist.

Monographs (selection) 
 Norm und Sanktion. Untersuchungen zum Sanktionsmechanismus. Walter, Olten 1967 
 Herrschaft über Bauern. Die Ausbreitung staatlicher Herrschaft über eine islamisch-urbanen Kultur in Gobir (Niger). Campus, Frankfurt 1978 
 Verwaltung in einem afrikanischen Bauernstaat. Das koloniale Französisch-Westafrika 1919–1939. Steiner, Wiesbaden 1982
 Founders of the Anthropology of Work. German Social Scientists of the 19th and Early 20th Centuries. Lit, Berlin 2008
 Anthropologie der Arbeit. Ein ethnographischer Vergleich. Springer Fachmedien, Wiesbaden 2016, ISBN 978-3-658-10433-7

Edited publications (selection) 
 with Mamadou Diawara und Farias Paulo: Heinrich Barth et l’Afrique. Köppe, Köln 2006 
 with Peter Probst: Between Resistance and Expansion. Explorations of Local Vitality in Africa (= Beiträge zur Afrikaforschung, 18). Lit, Münster 2004
 with Hélène d'Almeida-Topor und Monique Lakroum: Le Travail en Afrique Noire. Représentations et pratiques à l’époque contemporaine. Karthala, Paris 2003.

Articles (selection) 
 Art. Arbeit. In: Bohlken Eike, :de:Christian Thies (eds.): Handbuch Anthropologie. Der Mensch zwischen Natur, Kultur und Technik. Metzler, München/Weimar 2009, pp. 300–304 
 Beginnings of the Anthropology of Work: Nineteenth Century Social Scientists and their Influence on Ethnography. In: Jürgen Kocka (eds.): Work in a Modern Society: The German Experience in European-American Perspective. Berghahn, Oxford 2009,pp. 37–53
 Herrschaft in Gobir – sakrales Königtum oder Despotie? In: Katharina Inhetveen, Georg Klute (Hrsg.): Begegnungen und Auseinandersetzungen. Festschrift für Trutz von Trotha. Rüdiger Köppe, Köln 2009,pp. 210–232 
 Contesting The Great Transformation: Work in Comparative Perspective. In: :de:Christopher Hann, Keith Harth (eds.): Market and Society: The Great Transformation Today. Cambridge University Press, Cambridge 2009, pp. 160–174 
 Caravaneers, Shopkeepers and Consumers – the Appropriation of Goods among the Kel Ewey Tuareg in Niger. In: Hans Peter Hahn (eds.): Consumption in Africa. Anthropological Approaches. Lit, Berlin 2008, pp. 147–172 
 with Hans Peter Hahn und Markus Vern: How Many Things Does Man Need? Material Possessions and Consumption in Three West African Villages (Hausa, Kasena and Tuareg) Compared to German Students. In: Hans Peter Hahn (Hrsg.): Consumption in Africa. Anthropological Approaches. Lit, Berlin 2008, pp. 173–200 
 Wissenschaft auf Reisen. Dichte Teilnahme und wissenschaftlicher Habitus bei Heinrich Barths Feldforschung in Afrika. In: Gabriele Cappai (Hrsg.): Forschen unter Bedingungen kultureller Fremdheit. Verlag für Sozialwissenschaften, Wiesbaden 2008, pp. 41–67 
 Alexander Tschajanow. In: Eins – Entwicklungspolitik. Vol.. 18–19, 2006, pp. 52–54
 Administrative Despotism in Peasant Societies. In: Bill Jenkins, Edward C. Page (Hrsg.): The Foundations of Bureaucracy in Economic and Social Thought. Elgar, Cheltenham 2004, vol. I, pp. 339–350
 Work – Transformation of Objects or Interaction with Subjects? In: Brigitta Benzing, Bernd Herrmann (eds.): Exploitation and Overexploitation in Societies Past and Present. Münster / Hamburg 2003, pp. 327–338 
 Savoir local et vitalité locale dans le contexte global. In: Mamadou Diawara (eds.): L’interface entre les savoirs des paysans et le savoir universel. Bamako und Paris: Le Figuier (Bamako) und Présence Africaine, (Paris), 2003, pp. 34–55 
 Warum sind die Kel-Ewey-Tuareg so schwarz? in: Gerhard Göttler (eds.): Die Sahara. Mensch und Natur in der größten Wüste der Erde, DuMont, Köln 1984, ISBN 3-7701-1422-1, S. 300–302.

References

Further reading 
 Kurt Beck, Till Förster, Hans Peter Hahn (Hrsg.): Blick nach vorn. Festgabe für Gerd Spittler zum 65. Geburtstag. Köppe, Köln 2004, ISBN 3-89645-403-X (pp. 359ff. Schriftenverzeichnis).

External links 
 by and about Gerd Spittler in the catalogue of the German National Library (DNB)
 Homepage von Gerd Spittler an der Universität Bayreuth
 Gerd Spittler beim Institut für Afrikastudien Bayreuth
 Antrag zur Ehrenmitgliedschaft in der Deutschen Gesellschaft für Völkerkunde 2007
 Gerd Spittler, ResearchGate

1939 births
German anthropologists
German ethnologists
German sociologists
African studies
Area studies
Living people